Jingxi is a town in Minhou County, Fujian province, China. , it has six residential neighborhoods and 13 villages under its administration:
Neighborhoods
Jingxi Community
Houyu Community
Gushanzhou Community
Yongfeng Community
Dajia Community
Fugu Community

Villages
Heyang Village
Renzhou Village
Liudun Village
Guanzhong Village
Guanxi Village
Puqian Village
Guandong Village
Guankou Village
Xixia Village
Gangtou Village
Guangming Village
Tongkou Village
Taotian Village

See also 
 List of township-level divisions of Fujian

References 

Township-level divisions of Fujian
Minhou County